Calling is the twenty-second single by B'z, released on July 9, 1997. This song is one of B'z many number-one singles in Oricon chart. The song was used as a theme of TV drama Glass Mask, an adaptation of the famous shōjo manga of the same name. It sold 1,000,020 copies according to Oricon.

Track listing 
Calling
Gimme Your Love (Live at Tokyo Dome)

Certifications

References

External links
B'z official website

1997 singles
B'z songs
Oricon Weekly number-one singles
Japanese television drama theme songs
Songs written by Tak Matsumoto
Songs written by Koshi Inaba